Mark Andrew Draper (born 11 November 1970) is an English football coach and former professional footballer.

As a player, he was a midfielder from 1988 to 2003, notably in the Premier League for Leicester City, Aston Villa and Southampton. He also played in Spain for Rayo Vallecano and in the Football League with Notts County. He represented England at under-21 level. In 2009, he briefly came out of retirement for non-league side Dunkirk.

Since retiring Draper had a spell as kit man for former side Notts County but has since moved into coaching and runs a football training centre for children in Nottingham.

Playing career
Draper began his career as a product of the youth system at Notts County, making his professional debut in December 1988. A talented midfielder, he became recognised by County supporters as one of the most gifted young players ever developed at the club. After attracting the attention of a number of bigger clubs, Draper was finally sold during the 1994 close season to Leicester City for £1.25 million – a record fee for the club at the time.

Draper spent the entire 1994–95 season at Filbert Street, playing 39 times in the Premier League (to which they had just been promoted) and scoring five goals, although it was not enough to prevent relegation for a side who were never out of the bottom two after November. Despite this he was called up to the England squad by Terry Venables.

His form attracted the attention of Aston Villa, who paid £3.25 million to keep him in the Premier League. Over the next four seasons Draper became a regular in the Aston Villa starting line-up, helping them to a League Cup win in 1996. He received another call up to the England squad, this time by Glenn Hoddle for a World Cup qualifier against Moldova. However, he stayed on the bench and was ultimately never capped for the senior team.

Draper fell out of favour in the 1999–2000 season, appearing in only one game to bring his Villa total up to 120 league appearances (7 goals), and was loaned to Rayo Vallecano in Spain. He was sold during that close season to Southampton for £1.5 million. By then approaching veteran stage, Draper added another 24 top flight appearances (with one goal against Middlesbrough) for the Saints before leaving the game.

Later career in non-league football
Draper made a brief playing comeback in 2009, signing for non-league side Dunkirk.

Draper was enticed back into the local non league game by Paul Rawden who took Draper to East Midlands Counties Football League side Radford as coach and the pair saved the club from relegation, Draper then followed Rawden to Arnold Town for the 2012–13 season for a brief spell before they both left the club.

Personal life
He is currently involved in property development. In 2009, he rejoined his old club Notts County as their kit man.

He currently works with ex-Aston Villa footballer Dave Norton at their soccer school "Draper Norton Football", based in Nottingham.

Career statistics

Notes

Honours
Individual
 PFA Team of the Year: 1993–94 First Division

References

External links
 
 ESPN Soccernet profile
 Aston Villa fan site profile
 Southampton fan site profile
 Aston Villa profile

1970 births
Living people
People from Long Eaton
Footballers from Derbyshire
English footballers
English expatriate sportspeople in Spain
England under-21 international footballers
Association football midfielders
Notts County F.C. players
Leicester City F.C. players
Aston Villa F.C. players
Rayo Vallecano players
Southampton F.C. players
Dunkirk F.C. players
English Football League players
Premier League players
La Liga players